Nayo Kamilah Wallace is an American actress. She is best known for her roles on Speed Racer as Minx, scientist and girlfriend to Racer X and on the Hub Network's Care Bears: Welcome to Care-a-Lot as the voice of Harmony Bear from its premiere on June 2, 2012 until December 8, 2012. She also portrayed the character of Sarabi in The Lion King on Broadway.

Personal life
Nayo Kamilah Wallace was born in Detroit, Michigan.

Filmography

References

External links
 

Living people
Actresses from Detroit
20th-century American actresses
21st-century American actresses
American film actresses
American television actresses
American stage actresses
American video game actresses
American voice actresses
African-American actresses
20th-century African-American women
20th-century African-American people
1970 births
21st-century African-American women
21st-century African-American people